Abbeville-Saint-Lucien is a commune in the Oise department in northern France.

Population

Historical Importance
On 11 and 12 September, during the Battle of Bzura, the British and the French made a decision not to help Poland. The ships with military cargo for Poland (to reach the Polish military through then neutral Romania) were turned around. In 1944, Abbeville was liberated by the General Stanislaw Maczek's Polish 1st Armoured Division.

Notable residents
Roman Opałka (1931–2011), Polish painter, a representative of conceptual art

See also
 Communes of the Oise department

References

Communes of Oise